Rodney Wylie OBE (C) is an accountant and Queensland corporate figure, who over the last 50 years has held the position of either company director or chairman of several Queensland companies, including national and international organisations.  Some of these include Peat Marwick Mitchell, the Institute of Chartered Accountants, QUF Industries Ltd (later Pauls Ltd); Theiss Pty Ltd; Leightons; Queensland AMP Society; Queensland Alumina Ltd; Markwell Fisheries Pty Ltd; Australian United Foods; Pioneer Sugar Mills Ltd; the Bank of Queensland; and several not-for-profit groups.

He held leadership positions such as inaugural Chairman of the Queensland Competition Authority; Chairman of the Brisbane Cricket Ground Trust; Queensland Enterprise Group; the Red Shield Appeal; Institute of Company Directors and President of the Institute of Public Affairs (Queensland).

In 1988 Rodney was awarded the Order of the British Empire - Officer (Civil) for his contributions to the accountancy profession.

In 2017 Rodney Wylie was inducted into the Queensland Business Leaders Hall of Fame.

Rod is the father of businessman John Wylie.

References

External links
 Rod Wylie OBE(C) digital story and oral history: Queensland Business Leaders Hall of Fame 2016, State Library of Queensland

Australian businesspeople
Living people
Australian Members of the Order of the British Empire
Year of birth missing (living people)